Peter John Landin (5 June 1930 – 3 June 2009) was a British computer scientist. He was one of the first to realise that the lambda calculus could be used to model a programming language, an insight that is essential to the development of both functional programming and denotational semantics.

Academic
Landin was born in Sheffield, where he attended King Edward VII School; he graduated from Clare College, Cambridge University. From 1960 to 1964, he was the assistant to Christopher Strachey when the latter was an independent computer consultant in London. Most of his work was published during this period and the brief time he worked for Univac and at the Massachusetts Institute of Technology in the United States, before taking a position at Queen Mary University of London. During the 1970s and 1980s, his efforts went into building the computer science department in Queen Mary College, developing courses, and teaching students, as set forth in the foreword to the textbook Programming from First Principles. On his retirement, he was appointed Emeritus Professor of Theoretical Computation at Queen Mary University of London, where in 2012, the computer science building was renamed the Peter Landin Building in his honour.

At a workshop at the Science Museum, London, in 2001, on the history of programming semantics he spoke of how his scholarly career in computer science began in the late 1950s and of how he was much influenced by a study of John McCarthy's Lisp language when the most commonly used language was Fortran.

He was active in the definition of the ALGOL programming language. He is listed among those who attended the November 1959 conference in Paris, and the 1962 conference, and cited by Tony Hoare as one of the people who taught him ALGOL 60 and hence facilitated his expression of powerful recursive algorithms:

Landin was involved with international standards in programming and informatics, as a member of the International Federation for Information Processing (IFIP) IFIP Working Group 2.1 on Algorithmic Languages and Calculi, which specified, maintains, and supports the programming languages ALGOL 60 and ALGOL 68.

Landin is responsible for inventing the stack, environment, control, dump SECD machine, the first abstract machine for a functional programming language, and the ISWIM programming language, defining the Landin off-side rule and for coining the term syntactic sugar. The off-side rule allows bounding scope declaration by use of white spaces as seen in languages such as Miranda, Haskell, Python, and F# (using the light syntax).

Another phrase originating with Landin is "The next 700 ..." after his influential paper The next 700 programming languages. "700" was chosen because Landin had read in the Journal of the ACM that there were already 700 programming languages in existence. The paper opens with the quotation "... today ... 1,700 special programming languages used to 'communicate' in over 700 application areas." It also includes the joke that

a reference to his earlier paper. This dry sense of humour is expressed in many of his papers.

Political
Landin, who was bisexual, became involved with the Gay Liberation Front (GLF) during the early 1970s. He was once arrested as part of an anti-nuclear demonstration.
He was a dedicated cyclist and moved around London on his bike until it became physically impossible for him to do so.

Legacy
The Bodleian Library in Oxford holds an archive of material relating to Peter Landin. Since 2010, there has been an Annual Peter Landin Semantics Seminar held annually each December in memory of Peter Landin and organized by the BCS-FACS Specialist Group on Formal Aspects of Computing Science. The first seminar was delivered by the American computer scientist John C. Reynolds (1935–2013). There is a Peter Landin Building at Queen Mary University of London housing teaching and research facilities for computer science.

Selected publications
 
 
 
  Reprinted in

See also
 J operator

Notes

Sources

External links
 
 , BCS Computer Conservation Society seminar, Science Museum, London, UK, 5 June 2001
 Memorial talk on Landin's life by Olivier Danvy at ICFP 2009
 Peter Landin's talk at Program Verification and Semantics: The Early Work, 2001 (video)

1930 births
2009 deaths
People educated at King Edward VII School, Sheffield
Alumni of Clare College, Cambridge
English computer scientists
Programming language researchers
Formal methods people
Massachusetts Institute of Technology faculty
Academics of Queen Mary University of London
Bisexual men
Bisexual scientists
English LGBT people
British LGBT scientists
British anti–nuclear weapons activists
English LGBT rights activists
Bisexual academics
20th-century LGBT people